Lagos is the most populous city in Africa with an estimated population of 15.9 million in 2015. The estimated population for Lagos city was more than 24 million in 2022; and around 30 million for the Lagos metropolitan area, including the suburban area reaching far into the neighbouring Ogun State, thus making Lagos the most populous urban area in Africa. Lagos was the national capital of Nigeria until December 1991 following the government's decision to move their capital to Abuja in the centre of the country. Lagos is a major African financial centre and is the economic hub of Lagos State and Nigeria at large. The city has been described as the cultural, financial, and entertainment capital of Africa, and is a significant influence on commerce, entertainment, technology, education, politics, tourism, art, and fashion. Lagos is also among the top ten of the world's fastest-growing cities and urban areas. The megacity has the fourth-highest GDP in Africa and houses one of the largest and busiest seaports on the continent. The Lagos metropolitan area is a major educational and cultural centre in Sub Saharan Africa. Due to the large urban population and port traffic volumes, Lagos is classified as a Medium-Port Megacity.

Lagos initially emerged as a home to the Awori subgroup of the Yoruba of West Africa islands, which are contained in the present day Local Government Areas (LGAs) of Lagos Island, Eti-Osa, Amuwo-Odofin and Apapa. Due to rapid urbanisation, the city expanded to the west of the lagoon to include areas in the present day Lagos Mainland, Ajeromi-Ifelodun, and Surulere. This led to the classification of Lagos into two main areas: the Island, which was the original city of Lagos, and the Mainland, which it has since expanded into. This city area was governed directly by the Federal Government through the Lagos City Council, until the creation of Lagos State in 1967, which led to the splitting of Lagos city into the present-day seven Local Government Areas (LGAs), and an addition of other towns (which now make up 13 LGAs) from the then Western Region to form the state.

However, the state capital was later moved to Ikeja in 1976, and the federal capital moved to Abuja in 1991. Even though Lagos is still widely referred to as a city, the present-day Lagos, also known as "Metropolitan Lagos", and officially as "Lagos Metropolitan Area" is an urban agglomeration or conurbation, consisting of 16 LGAs including Ikeja, the state capital of Lagos State. This conurbation makes up 37% of Lagos State total land area, but houses about 85% of the state's total population.

The exact population of Metropolitan Lagos is disputed. In the 2006 federal census data, the conurbation had a population of about 8 million people. However, the figure was disputed by the Lagos State Government, which later released its own population data, putting the population of Lagos Metropolitan Area at approximately 16 million. Daily, the Lagos area is growing by some 3,000 people or around 1.1 million annually, so the true population figure of the greater Lagos area in 2022 is roughly 28 million (up from some 23.5 million in 2018). Lagos may therefore have overtaken Kinshasa as Africa's most populous city. As of 2015, unofficial figures put the population of "Greater Metropolitan Lagos", which includes Lagos and its surrounding metro area, extending as far as into Ogun State, at approximately 21 million.

History 

Lagos was originally inhabited by the Awori subgroup of the Yoruba people in the 15th century and Binis in the 16th century. The Awori moved to an island now called Iddo and then to the larger Lagos Island. Because the area was dominated by the then expansive Benin Empire, they called it Eko, from the late 16th century to the mid-19th century. The name Eko was given to it by Oba Ado a prince from Benin Kingdom. Eko is still the native name for Lagos to date.

Lagos (Portuguese for "lakes") was a name given to the settlement by the Portuguese. Throughout history, it was home to a number of warring ethnic Yoruba groups who had settled in the area. Following its early settlement by the Awori nobility, the state first came to the attention of the Portuguese in the 15th century.

Portuguese explorer Rui de Sequeira visited the area in 1472, naming the area around the city Lago de Curamo, which means Lake of Curamo.

In Britain's early 19th-century fight against the transatlantic slave trade, its West Africa Squadron or Preventative Squadron as it was also known, continued to pursue Portuguese, American, French, and Cuban slave ships and to impose anti-slavery treaties with West African coastal chiefs with so much doggedness that they created a strong presence along the West African coast from Sierra Leone all the way to the Niger Delta (today's Nigeria) and as far south as Congo. In 1849, Britain appointed John Beecroft Consul of the Bights of Benin and Biafra, a position he held (along with his governorship of Fernando Po) until his death in 1854. John Duncan was appointed Vice Consul and was located at Whydah. At the time of Beecroft's appointment, the Kingdom of Lagos (under Oba Kosoko) was in the western part of the Consulate of the Bights of Benin and Biafra and was a key slave trading port. In 1851 and with pressure from liberated slaves who now wielded political and business influence, Britain intervened in Lagos in what is now known as the Bombardment of Lagos or Capture of Lagos resulting in the installation of Oba Akitoye and the ouster of Oba Kosoko. Oba Akitoye then signed the Treaty between Great Britain and Lagos abolishing slavery. The signing of the 1852 treaty ushered in the Consular Period in Lagos' history wherein Britain provided military protection for Lagos.

Following threats from Kosoko and the French who were positioned at Whydah, a decision was made by Lord Palmerston (British Prime Minister) who noted in 1861, "the expediency of losing no time in assuming the formal Protectorate of Lagos". William McCoskry, the Acting Consul in Lagos with Commander Bedingfield convened a meeting with Oba Dosunmu on 30 July 1861 aboard HMS Prometheus where Britain's intent was explained and a response to the terms were required by August 1861. Dosunmu resisted the terms of the treaty but under the threat to unleash a bombardment on Lagos by Commander Bedingfield, Dosunmu relented and signed the Lagos Treaty of Cession on 6 August 1861.

Lagos was declared a colony on 5 March 1862. The remainder of modern-day Nigeria was seized in 1887, and when the Colony and Protectorate of Nigeria was established in 1914, Lagos became its capital, continuing as such after the country's independence from Britain in 1960. Along with migrants from all over Nigeria and other West African nations were the returnee ex-slaves known as Creoles, who came from Freetown, Sierra Leone, Brazil, and the West Indies to Lagos. The Creoles contributed to Lagos' modernization and their knowledge of Portuguese architecture can still be seen from the architecture on Lagos Island. Since the 19th century, Lagos gradually transformed into a melting pot of Africans and Europeans. Railway links and telephone cables connecting Lagos to London had been established by 1886. Electric street lighting was introduced in the city in 1898.

Lagos experienced rapid growth throughout the 1960s and 1970s as a result of Nigeria's economic boom.
Before the creation of Lagos State on 27 May 1967, Lagos, which was the country's capital had been administered directly by the Federal Government as a Federal Territory through the Federal Ministry of Lagos Affairs, while the Lagos City Council (LCC) governed the city. Lagos, along with the towns from the then Western region (Ikeja, Agege, Mushin, Ikorodu, Epe and Badagry), were eventually captured to create Lagos State. Lagos city was split into the present day seven Local Government Areas (LGAs), while the other towns now make up 13 LGAs in the state. Lagos played the dual role of being the State and Federal Capital until 1976 when the state capital was moved to Ikeja. Lagos was adversely affected during Nigeria's military rule. Also, on 12 December 1991, the seat of the Federal Government was also formally relocated to Abuja. However, Lagos remains the financial center of the country, and also grew to become the most populous conurbation in the country.

Administration 
Lagos was formerly the capital city of Nigeria, but it has since been replaced by Abuja. Abuja officially became the capital of Nigeria on 12 December 1991, although the decision to move the federal capital had been made in now Act no. 6 of 1976. Lagos is also home to the High Court of the Lagos State Judiciary, housed in an old colonial building on Lagos Island.

In terms of administration, Lagos is not a single municipality and therefore has no overall city administration. The geographical city limits of Metropolitan Lagos comprise 16 of the 20 Local Government Areas of Lagos State. The latter entity provides overall government for the metropolitan region. The former Municipality of Lagos, which covered Lagos Island, Ikoyi, and Victoria Island as well as some mainland territory, was managed by the Lagos City Council (LCC), but it was disbanded in 1976 and divided into several Local Government Areas (most notably Lagos Island LGA, Lagos Mainland LGA and Eti-Osa LGA).

The mainland beyond the Municipality of Lagos, on the other hand, included several separate towns and settlements such as Mushin, Ikeja and Agege. In the wake of the 1970s Nigerian oil boom, Lagos experienced a population explosion, untamed economic growth, and unmitigated rural migration. This caused the outlying towns and settlements to develop rapidly, thus forming the present-day "Lagos Metropolitan Area", also known as "Metropolitan Lagos". The history of Lagos is still evidenced in the layout of the LGAs that display the unique identities of the cultures that created them.

By 2006, the metro area around Lagos had extended beyond Lagos State's boundaries and attained a megacity status. This much larger area is referred to as "Greater Metropolitan Lagos" or "Lagos Megacity Region", which is a continuously built-up land area of an additional , in LGAs situated next to Lagos' eastern and western city limits in Lagos State, and also beyond its northern limits, spilling into some LGAs in adjoining Ogun State. Ogun State LGAs that have become part of Greater Metropolitan Lagos include Obafemi Owode, Sagamu, Ifo, Ado-Odo/Ota and part of Ewekoro.

Today, the word Lagos most often refers to the urban area, called "Metropolitan Lagos" in Nigeria, which includes both the islands of the former municipality of Lagos and the mainland suburbs. Lagos State government is responsible for some of the utilities including roads and transportation, power, water, health, and education. Metropolitan Lagos extends over 16 of the 20 LGAs of Lagos State and contains about 85% of the population of Lagos State, including some semi-rural areas. Lagos has a considerable number of high-rise buildings that dominate its skyline. Most of the tall buildings are located in the downtown Central Business District.

Demography 

Although the 2006 National Population Census of Nigeria credited the metropolitan area with a population figure of 7,937,932, the figure is at variance with some projections by the UN and other population agencies and groups worldwide. The population figure of Lagos State given by the Lagos State Government is 17,553,924. That figure was based on claimed conducted enumeration for social planning by the Lagos State Government "parallel census" and it believes that since the inhabitants of the metropolitan area of Lagos constitute 88% of the Lagos State population, the population of metropolitan Lagos is about 15.5 million.

A rejoinder to Lagos State Government views concluded that Lagos State concealed the fact that the population projection, for Lagos Urban Agglomeration by the UN agencies, had been revised downwards substantially as early as 2003. It failed to interpret the two most important and fairly representative and reliable secondary data sets already in the public domain, the National Identity Card Scheme and the 2003 Voters Registration figures from INEC. The figures for 2007 Voters Registration by INEC were an act subsequent to the release of the provisional census results and comprehensively corroborate, vindicate and validate the population figures in no uncertain terms.
According to the official results of the 2006 census, there were 8,048,430 inhabitants in Metropolitan Lagos. This figure was lower than anticipated and has created controversy in Nigeria. Lagos Island, the central Local Government Area and historic center of Metropolitan Lagos, had a population of 212,700 at the 2006 Census.

Authorities of Lagos State have attacked the results of the 2006 census, accusing the Nigerian National Population Commission of having undercounted the population of the state. This accusation is denied by the National Population Commission. A study found that research carried out by Africapolis (the African subsidiary of e-Geopolis backed by the Agence française de développement), in addition to the cross-referencing of official figures with more scientific independent research concluded that the 2006 census figures for Lagos State of about 9 million were valid and that the state's own assessments are inflated.

Lagos is, by most estimates, one of the fastest-growing cities in the world. Lagos is currently experiencing a population increase of about 275,000 persons per annum. In 1999 the United Nations predicted that the city's metropolitan area, which had only about 290,000 inhabitants in 1950, would exceed 20 million by 2010 and thus become one of the ten most populated cities in the world.

Geography 

Lagos is loosely classified into two main geographical areas—the "Island" and the "Mainland".

Cityscape 

Lagos has the tallest skyline in Nigeria. The architectural styles in Lagos are diverse and range from tropical and vernacular to colonial European and ultramodern buildings or a mixture. Brazilian style architecture brought by the creoles is evident in buildings such as Water House and  Shitta Bey Mosque. Skyscrapers and most high rise buildings are centered on the islands, while the mainland has some high rise buildings. In recent years, the Lagos State government has renovated existing parks and green areas, with a long-term goal of expansion. Many good quality buildings are interspersed across the city.

Island 
The Island is a loose geographical term that is used to define the area of Lagos that is separated from the "Mainland" by the main channel draining the lagoon into the Atlantic Ocean, which forms Lagos Harbour. The Island is mainly a collection of Islands that are separated from each other by creeks of varying sizes and are connected by bridges. The smaller sections of some creeks have been dredged and built over. This part of Lagos is the area where most business activities and entertainment events in Lagos take place. It also houses most of the upscale residential areas in Lagos. The Local Government Areas (LGAs) that are considered to be on the Island include Lagos Island and Eti-Osa. The major upscale Island neighborhoods within these LGAs include Ikoyi and Victoria Island. Three major bridges join the Island to the Mainland. They are the Carter Bridge, which starts from Iddo; the Eko Bridge (formerly called the Second Mainland Bridge); and the Third Mainland Bridge, which passes through densely populated mainland suburbs to the Lagos Lagoon. The Ikoyi link bridge links Ikoyi and Lekki Phase 1, both of which are part of the Island.

Construction on the Fourth Mainland Bridge will commence in 2022, according to Lagos State Governor, Babajide Sanwo-Olu.

Lagos Island 

Lagos Island contains a central business district. This district is characterized by high-rise buildings. The Island also contains many of the city's largest wholesale marketplaces (such as the popular Idumota and Balogun Markets). It also has the National Museum of Nigeria, the Central Mosque, the Glover Memorial Hall, Christ's Church Cathedral (CMS) and the Oba's Palace (Iga Idunganran). Another major part of Lagos Island is Marina. It borders the idumota and Balogun markets and houses major Banking institutions. Though formerly in a derelict condition, Lagos Island's Tinubu Square is a site of historical importance; it was here that the Amalgamation Ceremony that unified the North and South protectorate to form Nigeria took place in 1914.

Ikoyi

Ikoyi is situated on the eastern half of Lagos Island and joined to it by a landfill. Ikoyi is also connected to Victoria Island by Falomo bridge, which carries the main road over Five Cowrie creek. Falomo garden, a green public space which was developed by the state government in conjunction with Fidelity Bank in 2017, is located under the bridge. Ikoyi housed the headquarters of the federal government of Nigeria and other buildings owned by the government, including the old federal secretariat complex. The complex today is on reestablishment.

In Ikoyi there are military and police barracks, a top-security prison, and a federal high court of Nigeria. Ikoyi also has a number of hotels, nightclubs, a recreational park, and one of Africa's largest golf courses. Originally a middle class neighborhood, in recent years, it has become a fashionable residential enclave for the upper middle class to the upper class. There are also commercial activities in Ikoyi, which are spotted in an increasing number of offices, banks, and shopping complexes. The commercial section is concentrated in the South-West.

Victoria Island 

Victoria Island with its annex is situated to the south of Lagos Island and known with a zip code of 101241 as assigned by NIPOST. It has expensive real estate properties and for that reason, many new luxury condos and apartments are blooming up everywhere.
Along with Ikoyi, Victoria Island occupies a major area in Lagos that boasts several sizeable shopping districts. On its seashore along the Atlantic front, there is an environmentally reconstructed Bar Beach.

Ajah/Lekki

The Lekki Peninsula shares some prestige with its Ikoyi and Victoria Island neighbors. Development has stretched the piece of land further such that the Ibeju axis, though closer to Epe (which is literally on the outskirts of Lagos) is almost always described as part of Lekki.  The expanse of land starts from the Lekki toll gate, which was the focal stage of the famous #EndSars protest in October 2019, and ends in Ibeju-Lekki and boasts of communities slowly inching their way to suburb status such as Ajah, Awoyaya, Sangotedo, Abijo, and Eputu. There is quite a bit of places to see – the Lekki Conservation Centre; The Novare Mall; The Lekki Free Trade Zone – Dangote, Africa's richest man is building his refinery in this FTZ; Lagos Business School; Eleko Beach; Elegushi Beach; La Camaigne Tropicana – a beach/tourist getaway, Pan-Atlantic University. The area even boasts a Catholic monastery.

Iddo 
Across the main channel of the lagoon from Lagos Island, there is a smaller settlement called Iddo. Iddo is also a railroad terminus and it is now situated in the Lagos Mainland Local Government Area after it was connected to the Mainland like a peninsula.

Mainland 
A huge population of Lagosians also live on the Lagos Mainland, and most industries are located there. The Mainland is known for its music and nightlife, which used to be located in areas around Yaba, Ikeja and Surulere. However, in recent years more nightclubs have sprung up on the Island, making the Island (particularly Victoria Island, Ikate, and Lekki Phase 1) the main nightlife attraction. Mainland LGAs include Surulere, Apapa, and Lagos Mainland. Metropolitan Lagos suburban LGAs include: Agege, Amuwo Odofin, Mushin, Oshodi-Isolo and Ikeja (site of Murtala Muhammed International Airport and the capital of Lagos State).

Major areas on the Mainland include Ebute Metta, Yaba and Ejigbo. Some rivers, like Badagry Creek, flow parallel to the coast for some distance before exiting through the sand bars to the sea.

Urban parks and squares 

Freedom Park is a memorial and leisure park area in the middle of downtown Lagos in Lagos Island, Nigeria which was formerly Her Majesty's Broad Street Prison. It was designed by the Architect Theo Lawson.

The Park was constructed to preserve the history and cultural heritage of Nigerians. Monuments in the park reveal the Lagos colonial heritage and history of Her Majesty's Broad Street prisons. It was built to commemorate the 50th-anniversary independence celebration in October 2010. The Park serves as a National Memorial, a Historical landmark, a Cultural site, Arts and Recreation center.

The park, which is now a serene abode for individuals, visitors' collective contemplation and interaction are open to the public every day. Today, freedom park has become a venue for diverse social events and recreational entertainment.

Tinubu Square (formerly Independence Square), is an open space landmark located in Broad Street, Lagos Island, Lagos State, Nigeria named after the Yoruba slave trader, merchant, and aristocrat Madam Efunroye Tinubu. It used to be called Ita Tinubu before it was named Independence Square by leaders of the First Nigerian Republic after Nigerian independence and subsequently Tinubu Square.

The Tafawa Balewa Square, (TBS) is a  ceremonial ground (originally called "Race Course") in Lagos Island, Lagos. The entrance to the square has gigantic sculptures of four white horses hovering above the gate and seven red eagles, which are symbols from the national emblem signifying Strength and Dignity respectively. Other monuments in the square include the Remembrance Arcade 1(with memorials to World War I, World War II and Nigerian civil war victims) and the 26-storey Independence House, built in 1963 which was for a long time, the tallest building in Nigeria.

Climate 
Lagos experiences a tropical savanna climate (Aw) according to the Köppen climate classification, as there are four months under  of rain, and annual rainfall is not nearly high enough for tropical monsoon classification. The wet season starts in March and ends in October, while the dry season starts in November and ends in February. The wettest month is June with precipitation total , while the driest month is January with precipitation total .

Climate change 
A 2019 paper published in PLOS One estimated that under Representative Concentration Pathway 4.5, a "moderate" scenario of climate change where global warming reaches ~ by 2100, the climate of Lagos in the year 2050 would most closely resemble the current climate of Panama City.

Moreover, according to the 2022 IPCC Sixth Assessment Report, Lagos is one of 12 major African cities (Abidjan, Alexandria, Algiers, Cape Town, Casablanca, Dakar, Dar es Salaam, Durban, Lagos, Lomé, Luanda and Maputo) which would be the most severely affected by the future sea level rise. It estimates that they would collectively sustain cumulative damages of USD 65 billion under RCP 4.5 and USD 86.5 billion for the high-emission scenario RCP 8.5 by the year 2050. Additionally, RCP 8.5 combined with the hypothetical impact from marine ice sheet instability at high levels of warming would involve up to 137.5 billion USD in damages, while the additional accounting for the "low-probability, high-damage events" may increase aggregate risks to USD 187 billion for the "moderate" RCP4.5, USD 206 billion for RCP8.5 and USD 397 billion under the high-end ice sheet instability scenario. Since sea level rise would continue for about 10,000 years under every scenario of climate change, future costs of sea level rise would only increase, especially without adaptation measures.

Economy 

The city of Lagos is a major economic focal point in Nigeria, generating around 10% of the country's GDP. Most commercial and financial business is carried out in the central business district situated on the island. This is also where most of the country's commercial banks, financial institutions, and major corporations are headquartered. Lagos is also the major Information Communications and Telecommunications (ICT) hub of West Africa and potentially, the biggest ICT market in the continent. Lagos is developing a 24-hour economy.

Ports 

The Port of Lagos, formally known as the Lagos-Elbert Mathews Memorial Port, is Nigeria's leading port and one of the largest and busiest in Africa. Due to the large urban population, Lagos is categorized as a medium-port megacity using the Southampton System for port-city classification. It is administered by the Nigerian Ports Authority. The following types of vessels regularly call at the port of Lagos: Fishing vessels (18%), container ships (14%), oil/chemical tankers (13%), bulk carriers (12%), and offshore supply vessels (5%). The maximum length of vessels that have called at this port is 279 meters. The maximum draught is 13.5 m. The maximum carrying capacity is 113,306 t.

The port features a railhead. It is split into three main sections. The largest terminal is located in the Apapa district (Apapa Quays). This is where mainly general cargo is handled. Among other things, Apapa is home to a container port owned by the Danish company A. P. Møller-Mærsk, worth over one billion U.S. dollars. The next largest terminal is located on Tin Can Island. Containers and bulk cargo are handled here. The storage capacity of the silos is 28,000 tons of grain transported by Fleetwood Transportation. The terminal handles wheat, corn, and malt, and can receive about 4000 tons of grain daily. The port facilities can handle vessels with a capacity of about 30,000 tons. There is also a grain bagging facility on the site. The third is the Lagos oil port north of Apapa Quays.

Entertainment industry and media 

Lagos is the center of the West African film, music, and TV industries. The film industry in the Surulere locality ranks second or third in the world, ahead of or behind Hollywood, depending on the survey. PricewaterhouseCoopers Int. forecasts that the Nigerian entertainment industry will grow 85% to $15 billion.
Since the success of the Nigerian thriller "The Figurine", Nigerian film has increasingly turned to high-quality productions that are also commercially successful. This, in turn, has led to consistently new box office revenue records in Nigeria (2009's "The Figurine," 2013's "Half of a Yellow Sun," 2016's "The Wedding Party").

Lekki Free Trade Zone 

Lekki Free Trade Zone (Lekki FTZ) is a free zone situated in the eastern part of Lekki, which covers a total area of about 155 square kilometers. The first phase of the zone has an area of 30 square kilometers, with about 27 square kilometers for urban construction purposes, which would accommodate a total resident population of 120,000. According to the Master Plan, the free zone will be developed into a new modern city within a city with the integration of industries, commerce and business, real estate development, warehousing and logistics, tourism, and entertainment.

Lekki FTZ is divided into three functional districts; the residential district in the north, the industrial district in the middle, and the commercial trading/warehousing & logistics district in the southeast. The "sub-center" located in the south of the Zone is to be developed first. The region is close to the customs supervisory area, and it is mainly for commercial trading, logistics, and warehousing operations. The second phase is located in the north of the Zone adjacent to E9 Road (Highway) which will serve as central business district of the free zone. The area along E2 Road will be developed for financial and commercial businesses, estate properties & supporting facilities, high-end production service industries, and so on, which will link it to the sub-center of the Zone. The area along E4 Road will be used mainly for the development of logistics and industrial manufacturing/processing. A number of connection axes are also planned in between the principal axis and the sub-axis, with multi-functional service nodes to serve the whole of Lekki FTZ. Dangote Refinery is currently being built in the Lekki Free Zone.

In the start-up area of the Lekki Free Trade Zone, there will be a Commercial & Logistics Park which will cover a total area of 1.5 square kilometers. The Park is planned to be multi-functional with the integration of commerce, trading, warehousing, and exhibition. According to the Site Plan of the park, large construction works will be built in the park, including the "international commodities & trade center", the "international exhibition & conversation center", industrial factory workshops, logistics warehouses, office buildings, hotels and residential apartment buildings, amongst others.

Oil refinery 

Until now, paradoxically, oil exporter Nigeria had to import its oil derivatives (mainly gasoline) and oil processing by-products such as polypropylene. For this reason, the Dangote Group built an oil refinery in the Lekki district, which is expected to be operational in 2022 (as of December 2021). Job advertisements for this were placed in November 2021. The refinery is expected to process 650,000 barrels of oil per day when fully operational, and 327, 000 barrels of gasoline, 244,000 barrels of diesel, 56,000 barrels of aviation fuel, 800 megatons of propane, 2,500 megatons of polypropylene, and 100 megatons of sulfur. 9,000 direct jobs and 25,000 indirect jobs will be created by the refinery.

The oil industry has been a major polluter of Lagos' water sources for decades.

Software companies 
Software companies in Lagos work mainly in the telecommunications, banking, and education/employment services sectors. They are concentrated in the Lekki and Ikeja districts.

MTN maintains the first and still predominant 4G network in Nigeria. Airtel is another 4G provider. 9Mobile and Dataflex are Internet providers. Flutterwave is in the virtual bank card business. Opay is a platform for online bookings. Paystack is used by Nigerians who regularly receive payments from abroad. Andela trains software engineers and places them in the Nigerian job market. ULesson maintains a platform on which secondary school learning content is presented. Hotels.ng allows hotel bookings to be made throughout Africa.

Yaba has increasingly been a focal point with several software companies and engineering services companies set up around University of Lagos and Yabatech communities including Flutterwave and Andela. Several start-up incubators and entrepreneurs hubs are also located in the area which is sometimes called Yabacon valley in reference to Silicon Valley.

Automotive Industry 

Former Mercedes manager Oluwatobi Ajayi founded "Nord Automobiles Ltd" in the Sangotedo district in 2018. He benefited from the decline of the naira, which made importing vehicles unaffordable for many Nigerians. Nord has two assembly plants in Lagos: a  plant in Sangotedo, where all eight models are currently assembled; the second  plant in Epe is still under construction. Once completed, the assembly of the models will be moved to the new plant, while component manufacturing will take place in Sangotedo. The company currently manufactures its own plastic parts and plans to add steel stamping in the future. "In the new plant, we could produce about 1,000 vehicles per month. But the market is not yet big enough to justify assembly on that scale. We've only been selling officially since September, and our orders are increasing by 20% to 30% per month," Ajayi adds. The company offers eight different models, with the 3-ton pickup, the Nord Tank, being the most popular. The others are the Nord Max (2.6-ton pickup), Nord A3 (sedan), Nord A5 (luxury SUV), Nord Flit minibus, Nord Yarn, and Nord Tripper.

Fertiliser 
A fertiliser production plant was commissioned in the Lekki Free Trade Zone on May 3, 2022. It will produce 3 million tonnes of fertilizer a year. Since Russian fertilizer is refrained from coming onto the world market due to the Ukraine war 2022, Nigeria fills a gap in the market.

Pharmaceutical industry 

Nigeria hosts about 60 percent of the pharmaceutical production capacity in Africa (status 2022). The larger pharmaceutical companies in Nigeria are located in the North of Lagos. Emzor Pharmaceutical Industries Ltd appears to be the pharmaceutical producer with the most employees. Next in line are Fidson Healthcare Plc, May & Baker Nig. Plc and Swiss Pharma Nigeria.

Social situation 

There is a huge spectrum of wealth distribution among the people that reside in Lagos. It ranges from the very wealthy to the very poor. Lagos has attracted many young people and families seeking a better life from all other parts of Nigeria and beyond and this has also contributed to its cosmopolitan status. 

Oil export revenues have led to a general increase in prices and cost of living, making Lagos the most expensive city in Nigeria. Despite its oil wealth, long queues are commonplace at the country's gas stations due to gasoline shortages. Yet the city remains more or less functional, and rapid growth is producing intact infrastructures even without government intervention-despite what the West sees as a chaotic picture. Change and permeability characterize urban coexistence. One room is occupied by an average of four people, and life takes place primarily on the streets.
During the rush hour between the center and the residential areas, the main traffic routes are transformed into marketplaces. After improvements in living conditions, the 1990s with their economic and political crises led to mass impoverishment in Lagos as well.
In a 2018 ranking of cities by quality of life, Lagos ranked 212th among 231 cities surveyed worldwide.
Lagos has been ranked as one of the most expensive cities in the world. In some parts of Lagos, residents have one of the highest standards of living in Nigeria and in Africa. At the same time, a sizable proportion of the residents live in slums without access to piped water and sanitation.

Culture 

Lagos is famous throughout Africa for its music scene. Lagos has a vibrant nightlife and has given birth to a variety of styles such as Sakara music, Nigerian hip hop, highlife, juju, fuji and Afrobeats.

James Brown performed in Lagos in 1970. With his band Wings, Paul McCartney recorded his fifth post-Beatles album, Band on the Run, in an EMI studio in Lagos in August and September 1973. Other foreign musicians who have also performed in the city include Sean Paul, Snoop Dogg, 50 Cent, Akon, Jarule, Ashanti, Usher, Shaggy, R Kelly, Cardi B, Migos especially during the Star Mega Jam; Shakira, John Legend, Ludacris, Busta Rhymes, Boyz II Men, T-Pain, Brian McKnight, JayZ, Mary J. Blige, Beyoncé, Brandy, Ciara, Keri Hilson and Lauryn Hill, among others.

Iganmu is home to the primary center for the performing arts and artists in Nigeria: the National Arts Theatre.

Lagos is the center of the Nigerian movie industry, often referred to as 'Nollywood'. Idumota market on Lagos Island is the primary distribution center. Many films are shot in the Festac area of Lagos, where the World Festival of Black Arts was held.

The 2016 film Captain America: Civil War features a scene that is supposed to take place in Lagos.

Sports 

Association football is Lagos' most popular sport. Prominent Lagos football clubs include Bridge Boys F.C., MFM F.C., and First Bank: both play in Nigeria National League, the second tier of Nigerian football.

The Nigeria national football team, also known as the Super Eagles, used to play almost all of their home games in Lagos at the National Stadium in Surulere; much later, games were played at the then New Abuja National Stadium in Abuja for sometime; however, games are now mostly played at the newer Godswill Akpabio International Stadium in Uyo, which is the default home of the Super Eagles. Lagos also hosted the 2nd All-African games in 1973.

Tourism 

Lagos, subsequent to the re-modernization project achieved by the previous administration of Governor Raji Babatunde Fashola, is gradually becoming a major tourist destination, being one of the largest cities in Africa and in the world. Lagos is currently taking steps to become a global city and is rated as Beta − by the Globalization and World Cities Research Network. The 2009 Eyo carnival (a yearly festival originated from Iperu Remo, Ogun State), which took place on 25 April, was a step toward world city status. Currently, Lagos is primarily known as a business-oriented and fast-paced community.

Lagos has become an important location for African and Black cultural identity. Many festivals are held in Lagos; festivals vary in offerings each year and may be held in different months. Some of the festivals are Festac Food Fair held in Festac Town Annually, Eyo Festival, Lagos Black Heritage Carnival, Lagos Carnival, Eko International Film Festival, Lagos Seafood Festac Festival, LAGOS PHOTO Festival, and the Lagos Jazz Series, which is a unique franchise for high-quality live music in all genres with a focus on jazz. Established in 2010, the popular event takes place over a 3–5 day period at selected high-quality outdoor venues. The music is as varied as the audience itself and features a diverse mix of musical genres from rhythm and blues to soul, Afrobeat, hip hop, bebop, and traditional jazz. The festivals provide entertainment of dance and song to add excitement to travelers during a stay in Lagos.

Lagos has a number of sandy beaches by the Atlantic Ocean, including Elegushi Beach and Alpha Beach. Lagos also has a number of private beach resorts including Inagbe Grand Beach Resort and several others on the outskirts.

Lagos has a variety of hotels ranging from three-star to five-star hotels, with a mixture of local hotels such as Eko Hotels and Suites, Federal Palace Hotel, and franchises of multinational chains such as Intercontinental Hotel, Sheraton, and Four Points by Sheraton. Other places of interest include the Tafawa Balewa Square, Festac town, The Nike Art Gallery, Freedom Park, Lagos and the Cathedral Church of Christ, Lagos.

Cuisine 

Some of the famous dishes in Lagos include indigenous delicacies such as eba and egusi; amala and ewedu; jollof (the go-to party dish); ofada rice; plantains (locally called dodo); beans; suya (spicy shish kebab or spiced roasted beef), which is consumed in local clubs and bars with a bottle of cold beer; and eba, made from cassava and eaten with soups prepared with vegetables and mixture of spices and herbs. Other dishes range from local ones like Iyan (pounded yam) made from yam flour, amala; asaro, which is usually eaten with various kinds of vegetables; and Egusi (melon soup) to European, Middle-Eastern, and Asian cuisine.

Education 

The Lagos State Government operates state schools. The education system is the 6-3-3-4 system, which is practiced throughout the country (as well as by many other members of the Economic Community of West African States). The levels are Primary, Junior Secondary School (JSS), Senior Secondary School (SSS), and university. All children are offered basic education, with a special focus now on the first nine years. Many of the schools in Nigeria are federally funded and usually are boarding schools. A few examples are the Federal government college Odogbolu (FGCOdogbolu), the Federal government girls' college Sagamu (FGGCSagamu), and the Federal government college Kano (FGCKano). The state of Lagos has its own federally funded high schools namely Federal government college Ijanikin also known as FGC Lagos, King's College Lagos and Queen's College Lagos.

Lagos is home to various postsecondary schools, universities, and other vocational institutions that are either operated by the government or private entities.

Vocational schools 
 Institute for Industrial Technology (IIT) : founded in 2000, IIT is a technical vocational school for male youth from families with limited resources. Its educational model is based on the Dual Training System.

Polytechnics 
 Yaba College of Technology (YABATECH): founded in 1934, the college is Nigeria's first higher educational institution and the third in Africa. The college is a center of culture and heritage. Currently, it has student enrolments of over 16,000.
 Lagos State Polytechnic is a polytechnic comprising more than six schools including private polytechnics and was founded 25 years ago. Its main campus resides at Ikorodu, along Shagamu road.
 Lagos City Polytechnic, located at 6/8, Bashiru Oweh Street, Off Simbiat Abiola Road (formerly Medical Road), Ikeja – This is the first private Polytechnic in Nigeria. It was established in 1990 by Engr. Babatunde Odufuwa. Engr. Odufuwa hails from Oke-Aye in Ijebu North East Local Government Area (I.N.E.L.G) of Ogun State.
 Grace Polytechnic
 Wolex Polytechnic
 Federal College of Fisheries and Marine Technology is a monotechnic that offers courses in fisheries technology, general science, marine engineering and nautical science.
 Federal College of Education (tech) Akoka
 Ronik Polytechnic

Universities 

 The University of Lagos (UNILAG) Akoka, is a large institution dating from 1962, with over 55,000 students. It comprises 13 faculties, run by over 4,000 staff.
 Lagos State University (LASU) is a multi-campus university established in the year 1983 and owned by the Lagos State government. The main campus is located at Ojo, along the Lagos-Badagry Expressway.
 Pan-Atlantic University formerly known as Pan-African University has a business school (LBS), a school of Media and Communication (SMC), and an entrepreneurial development center (EDC), specialized in providing short courses for SMEs. Lagos Business School (LBS) is the most famous of them all, awarding world-class MBA and EMBA. The School of Media and Communication is also known for its pragmatic communication courses in the field of journalism, media, and marketing. SMC awards BSc., MSc., and Ph.D. in social science courses. Founded in 1996 and awarded University status in 2002.  The university also places some emphasis on the study of art, running the Virtual Museum of Modern Nigerian Art.
 National Open University of Nigeria is the first Open university in Nigeria; it is located on Ahmadu Bello Way, Victoria Island, Lagos.
 Caleb University is a private university located at Imota, Lagos.
 Lagos State College of Health Technology (LASCOHET) is an institution that runs health courses such as Health Information Management, Pharmacist Tech, Medical Laboratory Tech, Community Health Extension, and Environmental Health Technology; it is located in Yaba.
 Lagos State University College of Medicine (LASUCOM), Ikeja
 College of Medicine, University of Lagos (CMUL)

Healthcare 

Lagos has many hospitals and medical facilities, some of which have accomplished feats in Nigeria's medical history. For example, the oldest Nigerian hospital is located in the city as well as West Africa's first air-operated emergency medical service, which commenced in the city. The Lagos healthcare system is generally divided into public and private sectors that provide medical services at the primary, secondary, and tertiary levels.

Transportation 

Lagos has one of the largest and most extensive road networks in West Africa. It also has suburban trains and some ferry services. Highways are usually congested in peak hours, due in part to the geography of the city, as well as to its explosive population growth. Lagos is also linked by many highways and bridges.

Highways 

The Lagos–Ibadan Expressway and the Lagos–Abeokuta Expressway are the major controlled-access highways in the north of the city and serve as inter-state highways to Oyo State and Ogun State respectively. To the west the congested Lagos–Badagry Expressway serves outlying towns such as Festival Town, which was the location for the 1977 Festival of Black Arts and Culture 77.

Lagos' importance as a commercial center and port and its strategic location have led to it being the end-point of three Trans-African Highway routes using Nigeria's national roads. The Trans–West African Coastal Highway leaves the city as the Badagry Expressway to Benin and beyond as far as Dakar and Nouakchott; the Trans-Sahara Highway to Algiers, which is close to completion, leaves the city as the Lagos-Ibadan Expressway.

Local public transport 
The Lagos Metropolitan Area Transport Authority (LAMATA) is responsible for public transport.

Since 2021 using a bus or the light rail system is paid for with a public transport card without cash. This card can be used equally on BRT and LBSL buses. One can purchase a public transportation card at any of the ticketing booths at the bus terminals scattered across Lagos State.

City buses 
There are two city bus companies in Lagos: BRT (Lagos Bus Rapid Transit System) and LBSL (Lagos Bus Services). The city buses are air-conditioned.

BRT was inaugurated in 2008. BRT offers e-payment with bank cards. On two arterial roads (Ikorodu Road and Funsho Williams Avenue), a dedicated bus lane has been established for BRT buses. BRT uses diverse brands of buses, like Ashok Leyland and Yutong. Primero Transport Services (PTS) Ltd. is the sole operator of the BRT buses.

LBSL was inaugurated in 2019. LBSL uses Brazilian-built Marcopolo buses.

The central hub for city buses and long-distance buses is the Oshodi Bus Terminal, which is visible from afar. It is the largest bus station in West Africa and commenced operation in 2019.

Suburban rail 
Currently, a rapid transit system, the Lagos Light Rail, is under construction with the first section scheduled to open in 2022. The "Blue Line" will operate between Okokomaiko and Marina (East–west axis). The "Red Line" will run between Agbado and Marina (North–south axis).
Both lines will share three stations: Iddo, Ebute Ero, and Marina.
There are plans for more light rail lines:
 The green line (Marina to Lekki), 
 the yellow line (Otta/airport to Iddo), 
 the purple line (Redeem to Ojo), 
 The brown line (Mile 12 to Marina) and  
 the orange line (Redeem to Marina).

Rail transport 
As of 10 June 2021, Lagos has a double-track standard gauge line to Ibadan and a modern main station, Mobolaji Johnson. Departure times are 8:00 and 16:00 (on time). Ticket sales are over the counter and cash only (as of 2021). The operator is the Nigerian Railway Corporation.

Shared cabs 
A popular means of transportation are yellow minibusses called danfo. The yellow buses, most of the VW T3 or LT type, characterize the appearance of the city. They run on fixed routes, but without a timetable, according to the principle of shared cabs.

Ferries 
Lagos State Ferry Services Corporation runs a few regular routes, for example between Lagos Island and the mainland, served by modern ferries and wharves. Private boats run irregular passenger services on the lagoon and on some creeks.

Air traffic 
Lagos is served by Murtala Muhammed International Airport, one of the largest and busiest airports in Africa. The MMIA is Nigeria's premier international air gateway. The airport's history dates back to colonial times, around the time of the Second World War. The current international airport terminal was built and commissioned over 40 years ago, in 1978. The terminal opened officially on 15 March 1979. The airport had been known simply as the Lagos International Airport. It was, however, renamed for the late Nigerian Head of State, General Murtala Muhammed, who died in 1976.

The airport terminal has been renovated several times since the 1970s but its most radical makeover began in 2013, following the launch of the Federal government's multi-billion naira Remodelling/ Rehabilitation Programme for its airports nationwide. Under the re-modeling work there, by late in 2014, the MMA lounge area had been expanded to four times its previous size and new passenger handling conveyor systems were installed which can handle over 1,000 passengers per hour.

A second airport, Lekki-Epe International Airport is proposed.

Logistics hub 

In Ketu-Ereyun, between Epe and Ikorodu, Lagos State builds a "Food Logistics Park" - the biggest logistics hub for food in Sub-Saharan Africa. The site is 1.2 million square meters big and the construction is expected to be finished in 2024.

Timber trade 
In the middle of the city, in the Oko Baba district, there is (as of September 2022) a large transshipment center for timber, mainly redwood and mahogany. This timber trade, including a sawmill, will move to a new location, "Timberville", in December 2022.

Notable people

Business 
 Victoria Chibuogu Nneji, computer scientist, design and innovation strategist, and a lecturing fellow, known for her research on robotics and autonomous transportation
 Habeeb Okunola, businessman and philanthropist
 Toyin Saraki, global health advocate and healthcare philanthropist

Politicians and rulers 
 Akinwunmi Ambode, former Governor of Lagos state
 Rilwan Akiolu, Oba (traditional ruler) of Lagos
 Babatunde Fashola, Former Governor of Lagos and current Minister of Power, Works and Housing
 Lekan Fatodu, Politician and journalist
 Bode George, Politician
 Yemi Osinbajo, politician, lawyer, and current vice-president of Nigeria.
 Babajide Sanwo-Olu, Governor of Lagos State
 Bola Tinubu, Former Governor of Lagos State
 Funsho Williams, politician and one-time aspirant to the office of Lagos state governor

Sports 
 Kenny Adeleke (born 1983), basketball player
 Israel Adesanya, Former UFC middleweight champion
 Nelson Agholor, Professional American football player, Super Bowl LII Champion with the Philadelphia Eagles in 2018
 Tunji Awojobi (born 1973), professional basketball player
 Israel Idonije, Professional American football player, Chicago Bears 2003–2013, Detroit Lions 2013
 Uche Okechukwu, football player
 Hakeem Olajuwon, professional basketball player
 Anoure Obiora, football player
 Victor Osimhen, football player
 Arnaut Danjuma, football player
 Omos, professional wrestler

Other 

 Oyinkan Braithwaite, novelist and writer, who wrote My Sister, the Serial Killer
 Agbani Darego, Miss Nigeria 2001, Semifinalist Miss Universe 2001 and Miss World 2001
 Rosa Egipcíaca, Afro-Brazilian Catholic mystic, who wrote  Sagrada Teologia do Amor Divino das Almas Peregrinas
 Buchi Emecheta, novelist
Ovia Idah, Nigerian sculptor
Oluwashina Okeleji, sports journalist
Yvonne Orji, actress, comedian
 Esther Uzodinma, actress and producer

Twin towns – sister cities 

Lagos is twinned with:

  Atlanta, United States
  Gary, Indiana, United States
  Belo Horizonte, Brazil
  Bucharest, Romania
  Port of Spain, Trinidad and Tobago

See also 
 List of largest cities
 List of Governors of Lagos State

Explanatory notes

References

Further reading 
 Leithead, Alastair (August 2017). "The city that won't stop growing: How can Lagos cope with its spiralling population?" BBC News.

External links 

 
 State Judiciary of Lagos

 
15th-century establishments in Africa
Cities in Nigeria
Cities in Yorubaland
Former British colonies and protectorates in Africa
Former national capitals
Populated coastal places in Lagos State
Populated places established in the 15th century
Port cities and towns in Nigeria